Froges is a commune in the Isère department in southeastern France. It is part of the Grenoble urban unit (agglomeration).

Population

Twin towns
Froges is twinned with:

  Acquaviva, San Marino, since 1984

See also

References

External links

Communes of Isère
Isère communes articles needing translation from French Wikipedia